Cocolmeca is a common name for several plants and may refer to:

Dioscorea mexicana
Phaseolus ritensis
Smilax aristolochiifolia, native to Mexico and Central America